Goudavelly ( Gowdavally)  also Goudelli  is a village and panchayat in Rangareddy district, TS, India. It comes under Medchal mandal.

It is 15 kilometers away from Secunderabad. The Outer Ring Road, Hyderabad has a major junction in this village.

Villages in Ranga Reddy district